William Callahan may refer to:

William A. Callahan, Canadian political scientist 
William F. Callahan (1891–1964), chairman of the Massachusetts Turnpike Authority
Callahan Tunnel or William F. Callahan Tunnel, a Boston Harbor tunnel
William P. Callahan (born 1950), American Roman Catholic bishop
William R. Callahan (state representative) (1925–1976), Massachusetts state representative
William R. Callahan (priest) (1931–2010), American Roman Catholic priest
William Roger Callahan (1931–2022), journalist and politician in Newfoundland, Canada
William J. Callahan, Deputy Director of the United States Secret Service

Bill Callahan may refer to:
Bill Callahan (American football) (born 1956), American football coach
Bill Callahan (musician) (born 1966), American singer-songwriter
Bill Callahan (TV producer), former producer and writer for Scrubs

See also
William Callaghan (disambiguation)